James William Whilt (January 8, 1878 - March 10, 1967) was a cowboy poet known as "The Poet of the Rockies".

Biography
He was born on January 8, 1878, in Benton County, Minnesota. He moved to Fort Benton, Montana in 1900 and became a cowboy. He spent 30 years in Glacier National Park as a guide, caretaker, and trapper.

He died on March 10, 1967, in Kalispell, Montana.

Poems
Ain't it the Truth?

Publications
Rhymes of the Rockies (1922)
Our Animal Friends of the Wild (1927) 
Giggles from Glacier Guides (1935)
Mountain Echoes  (1951)

See also
Thomas Hornsby Ferril also known as "The Poet of the Rockies"
Cy Warman (1855–1914) also known as "The Poet of the Rockies"
Joaquin Miller (1837–1913) "The Poet of the Sierras"
National Cowboy Poetry Gathering

References

External links
 

1878 births
1967 deaths
American male poets
20th-century American poets
People from Benton County, Minnesota
People from Fort Benton, Montana
Cowboy poets
Poets from Minnesota
Poets from Montana
20th-century American male writers